Earl's Croome is a village and civil parish  in the Malvern Hills District in the county of Worcestershire, England.

History

The village is mentioned in the Domesday Book, 1086, as Crumba. The first part of its name is derived from the Earl of Coventry who had Earl's Croome Court as a residence opposite the village church. The church is St. Nicholas Church of England.

In 1377, or 1378, Henry de Ardern was granted the manor of Croome Adam (now Earls Croome) by the Earl of Warwick for a red rose.

Charles Coventry (1867–1929), who played cricket for England in the first two Test matches they played against South Africa, is buried in the village cemetery. He commanded the Worcestershire Yeomanry during the First World War and was captured by the Turks at Katia in April 1916, spending the rest of the conflict as a prisoner of war.

For the 2000 millennial celebration a map was produced about the village history called "The Parish of Earl's Croome 2000". A book was also produced.

References

External links
A History of the County of Worcester: volume 3 (1913)

Villages in Worcestershire
Civil parishes in Worcestershire
Malvern Hills District